Margaret J. Meeker (born 1957) is an American pediatrician and author of books on parenting from a Christian perspective.

Career 
Her commentary on the rise of teenage sexually transmitted diseases has caught attention in education and popular publications.  Meeker is invited onto broadcast programs on the topics she has written about, such as The Today Show, and The Ingraham Angle and she has a following in Christian groups on social and mainstream media and former President Donald Trump. Meeker is not professionally affiliated with conservative organizations. Meeker has written on gender roles in parenting and in adolescent psychology. She was formerly a supporter of birth control and later changed her views. Meeker cites psychological benefits as the basis of her support of sexual abstinence among teenagers, her views are quoted in analysis of the impact of pornography and the attitudes of the church to sexuality. She has appeared on various media programs such as 60 Minutes, The Today Show, Fox News's The Ingraham Angle, Donald Trump shared another one of her appearances on Fox & Friends, The Federalist, The Telegraph, and NPR. Her book Epidemic is the earliest known source of the Rainbow party urban myth.

Meeker is an adjunct clinical assistant professor at Michigan State University. She is a fellow of the American Academy of Pediatrics.

Selected works

References

External links
 
 

American pediatricians
Women pediatricians
American family and parenting writers
Living people
Michigan State University faculty
20th-century American women physicians
20th-century American physicians
21st-century American women physicians
21st-century American physicians
20th-century American women writers
21st-century American women writers
1957 births
American women academics